Lenka Kulovaná (born 25 October 1974) is a Czech former competitive figure skater. She is a three-time Prague Skate champion, the 1990 International de Paris silver medalist, and a three-time Czech national champion.

Personal life 
Kulovaná was born on 25 October 1974 in Ústí nad Labem, Czechoslovakia. She has a son, Daniel, with her husband, Emmanuel Petit, a French farrier.

Career 
Kulovaná won gold at the 1990, 1994, and 1995 Prague Skate (Czech Skate). She took silver at the 1990 International de Paris and the 1995 Nebelhorn Trophy.  

Kulovaná placed fifth at the 1992 European Championships, tenth at the 1993 World Championships, and competed at three Winter Olympics, placing 11th in 1992, 13th in 1994 and 18th in 1998. She was coached by František Pechar, Eva Horklová,  and Vlasta Kopřivová in Prague.

Kulovaná retired following the 1998 World Championships. After three years performing for Holiday on Ice, she coached skating in the United Arab Emirates, spent some time in Madagascar, and then returned to Ústí nad Labem.

Programs

Results
GP: Champions Series (Grand Prix)

References

1974 births
Czech female single skaters
Czechoslovak female single skaters
Olympic figure skaters of the Czech Republic
Olympic figure skaters of Czechoslovakia
Figure skaters at the 1992 Winter Olympics
Figure skaters at the 1994 Winter Olympics
Figure skaters at the 1998 Winter Olympics
Living people
Sportspeople from Ústí nad Labem